SM U-28 was a Type U 27 U-boat that served in the First World War. It conducted 5 patrols, sinking 40 ships totalling 90,126 GRT.

Career
U-28 was commissioned into the Imperial German Navy on 26 June 1914, with Freiherr Georg-Günther von Forstner (1882-1940) in command.
Commander von Forstner was relieved on 15 June 1916 by Otto Rohrbeck, who was in turn relieved on 5 August by Freiherr von Loe-Degenhart. On 15 January 1917, Georg Schmidt took command.

On 30 July 1915, U-28 sank the British steamer Iberian. According to Commander von Forstner's account of the incident, the wreckage remained under the water for about 25 seconds until an explosion sent some of the debris flying up. It is said that along with the debris, a creature described as a "gigantic aquatic animal" resembling a crocodile was seen, which quickly disappeared from sight.

Sinking
U-28s final patrol began on 19 August 1917, when it departed from Emden for the Arctic Ocean. U-28 scored a torpedo hit, and closed in to finish the steamer with gunfire. The shells detonated Olive Branchs cargo of munitions, which it had been carrying from England to Arkhangelsk, Russia, and the subsequent explosion so badly damaged the U-boat that it sank along with the steamer. All 39 of its crew were lost; some were seen swimming, but were not picked up by Olive Branchs lifeboats.

An alternative description of the event states that when the ammunition detonated, a truck carried as deck cargo was blown into the air and fell from a great height on the U-boat, sinking it.

Summary of raiding history

See also
SM UB-85

References

Notes

Citations

Bibliography

External links
 
 

Type U 27 submarines
U-boats commissioned in 1914
Maritime incidents in 1917
U-boats sunk in 1917
World War I submarines of Germany
Shipwrecks in the Barents Sea
1913 ships
Ships built in Danzig
Ships lost with all hands